Leu (or Low) sieu meaning "the Train of a garment", was one of the twenty-eight lunar mansions of the traditional Chinese astronomy.  It was one of the White Tiger of the West (西方白虎).

The asterisms in the Region of Leu （婁宿天區）

Notes

See also 
 Traditional Chinese star names

References 
 
 大崎正次 (1987). 『中国の星座の歴史』 雄山閣出版.

External links 
 陳冠中, 陳輝樺 「中國古代的星象系統 (71)： 婁宿天區」 - 天文教育資訊網 (AEEA)

Chinese constellations